Filadelfia Airport  is an airport serving the city of Filadelfia in Boquerón Department, Paraguay.

The Filadelfia non-directional beacon (ident: FIL) is located near the southern end of the field.

See also

 List of airports in Paraguay
 Transport in Paraguay

References

External links
 HERE Maps - Filadelfia
 OpenStreetMap - Filadelfia
 OurAirports - Filadelfia
 Filadelfia
 Skyvector Aeronautical Charts - Filadelfia

Airports in Paraguay